The Politics of Lombardy, Italy, takes place in a framework of a semi-presidential representative democracy, whereby the President of the Region is the head of government, and of a pluriform multi-party system. Legislative power is vested in the Regional Council of Lombardy, while executive power is exercised by the Regional Government led by the President, who is directly elected by the people. The current Statute, which regulates the functioning of the regional institutions, has been in force since 2008.

Prior to the rise of Fascism, most of the deputies elected in Lombardy were part of the liberal establishment (see Historical Right, Historical Left and Liberals), which governed Italy for decades. Lombardy was also the birthplace of the Italian Workers' Party, forerunner of the Italian Socialist Party (PSI), and its eastern and northern provinces were an early stronghold of the Italian People's Party. In the 1924 general election, which led Italy to dictatorship, Lombardy was one of the few regions, along with Veneto and Piedmont, which did not return an absolute majority to the National Fascist Party. After World War II Lombardy became a stronghold of the Christian Democracy, since the 1980s in association with the PSI, which was especially strong in Milan.

Traditionally, Lombardy gives centrist results in elections, reflecting its strong middle class. The Communists and their successors – the Democratic Party of the Left, the Democrats of the Left and the present-day Democratic Party – never prevailed. In the 1980s Lombardy saw the organisation of a new regionalist party, the Lombard League (LL), then merged into the Northern League (LN) in the 1990s.

Lombardy is now a stronghold of the "centre-right coalition" composed of the LN and the liberal conservative Forza Italia (FI), founded by Lombard entrepreneur Silvio Berlusconi. The coalition, which was joined by the LN in 2000, has governed the region since 1995, under three Presidents, Roberto Formigoni (CDU/FI/PdL), Roberto Maroni (LN) and Attilio Fontana (LN).

On 22 October 2017 an autonomy referendum took place in Lombardy: 38.3% of Lombards participated and 95.3% voted "yes".

Legislative branch

The Regional Council of Lombardy is composed of 80 members. 64 councillors are elected in provincial constituencies by proportional representation using the largest remainder method with a Droop quota and open lists, while 16 councillors (elected in a general ticket) come from a "regional list", including the President-elect. One seat is reserved for the candidate who comes second. If a coalition wins more than 50% of the total seats in the Council with PR, as happened during the 2000 election, only 8 candidates from the regional list will be chosen and the number of those elected in provincial constituencies will be 72. If the winning coalition receives less than 50% of votes, as happened during the 1995 election, special seats are added to the Council to ensure a large majority for the President's coalition.

The Council is elected for a five-year term, but, if the President suffers a vote of no confidence, resigns or dies, under the simul stabunt, simul cadent clause introduced in 1999 (literally they will stand together or they will fall together), also the Council is dissolved and a snap election is called.

2023–2028 composition

Source: Regional Council of Lombardy

Executive branch

The Regional Cabinet (Giunta Regionale) is presided by the President of the Region (Presidente della Regione), who is elected for a five-year term, and is currently composed by 17 members: the President and 16 regional Assessors, including a Vice President (Vice Presidente), while 4 under-secretaries (Sottosegretari) help the President but have no voting rights in the cabinet meetings.

Current composition
Attilio Fontana was officially sworn in for a second term as President on 1 March 2023. Current executive was officially sworn in on 10 March 2023.

Current composition

List of presidents

The current President of Lombardy is Attilio Fontana, who is serving for his first term after winning the 2018 regional election.

Local government

Provinces
Lombardy is divided in twelve provinces, which are a traditional form of local administration in the region, the first ones being yet established under Habsburg rule by Maria Theresa of Austria in the 18th century. Socialist and Christian-democratic ideas had an early diffusion in quite all the provinces around World War I. After the Fascist parenthesis, left-wing parties found their strongholds in south-eastern agricultural provinces near Emilia, especially in the Province of Mantua, while Christian Democracy obtained high scores in the northern mountainous part of the Region, where nowadays the Lega Lombarda–Lega gets a strong backing.

After the 2014 reform of local authorities the Province of Milan was replaced by the new Metropolitan City of Milan. Since 2014 the president of the province is no more elected directly by citizens, but is chosen by mayors and councilors of the municipalities of the province.

Municipalities
Lombardy is also divided in 1,546 comuni (municipalities), which have even more history, having been established in the Middle Ages when they were the main places of government. There are twelve provincial capital cities in Lombardy and twenty-four comuni have more than 40,000 inhabitants, most of which are ruled by the centre-left.

Provincial capitals

Others with 40,000+ inhabitants

Parties and elections

Latest regional election

In the latest regional election, which took place on 12–13 February 2023, Attilio Fontana (Lega Lombarda–Lega) was re-elected President of Lombardy with the support of centre-right coalition.

References

External links
Lombardy Region
Regional Council of Lombardy
Constitution of Lombardy

 
Lombardy